Sandseten Mountain is a flattish mountain 1 nautical mile (1.9 km) south of Krakken Mountain and just southwest of Gneysovaya Peak in Westliche Petermann Range, Wohlthat Mountains. Discovered and plotted from air photos by German Antarctic Expedition, 1938–39. Replotted from air photos and surveys by Norwegian Antarctic Expedition, 1956–60, and named Sandseten (the sand seat).

Mountains of Queen Maud Land
Princess Astrid Coast